Specify (foaled 1962) was a British-bred Thoroughbred racehorse who competed in National Hunt racing and is noted for winning the 1971 Grand National.

Background
Specify was a bay gelding bred in Norwich, England by Alan Parker. He was initially purchased by Arthur Freeman, a former jockey who had won the 1958 Grand National riding Mr. What. In 1970 Specify was bought by Fred Pontin.

Racing career

Specify won the 1969 Plate Handicap Chase before being bought by Fred Pontin who entered him in the 1970 Grand National were he was brought down at fence 22. He then went on to win the 1971 Grand National in a tightly fought race between five horses, Specify managed to win by a neck. He would then compete in the 1972 Grand National coming in 6th.

Grand National record

References

1962 racehorse births
Racehorses bred in the United Kingdom
Racehorses trained in the United Kingdom
Grand National winners